Ridgeway House may refer to:

United Kingdom
Ridgeway House, Ridgeway Street, Douglas, Isle of Man, one of Isle of Man's Registered Buildings
Ridgeway House, a historic house included within Mill Hill School, a school in Mill Hill, North London, England

United States
Ridgeway (Louisville, Kentucky), a historic house listed on the National Register of Historic Places (NRHP) in Jefferson County
David Ridgeway House, Safford, Arizona, NRHP-listed in Graham County

See also
Marion Ridgeway Polygonal Barn, LaPorte, Indiana
Ridgeway (disambiguation)